Dobri Dobrev (born 2 May 1982) is a Bulgarian footballer who currently plays for Vitosha Bistritsa as a midfielder.

External links
 
 

1982 births
Living people
Bulgarian footballers
Botev Plovdiv players
PFC Vidima-Rakovski Sevlievo players
FC Vitosha Bistritsa players
First Professional Football League (Bulgaria) players
Association football midfielders